Vanguard: A Libertarian Communist Journal was a monthly anarchist political and theoretical journal, based in New York City, published between April 1932 and July 1939, and edited by Samuel Weiner, among others.

Vanguard began as a project of the Vanguard Group, composed of members of the editorial collective of the Road to Freedom newspaper, as well as members of the Friends of Freedom group. Its initial subtitle was  "An Anarchist Youth Publication", but changed to "A Libertarian Communist Journal " after issue 1.

Within several issues Vanguard would become a central sounding board for the international anarchist movement, including reports of developments during the Spanish Revolution as well as movement reports by Augustin Souchy and Emma Goldman.

Contributors
The following is a partial list of contributors whose essays were published in Vanguard:

"Samuel Weiner" (Sam Dolgoff)
S Morrison
Senex
Abe Coleman
Roman Weinrebe

References
Excerpt from "Anarchist Voices: An Oral History of Anarchism in America" by Paul Avrich (Princeton University Press)

Monthly magazines published in the United States
Anarchist periodicals published in the United States
Defunct political magazines published in the United States
Magazines established in 1932
Magazines disestablished in 1939
Magazines published in New York City